Santa Helena Esporte Clube, commonly known as Santa Helena, is a Brazilian football club based in Santa Helena de Goiás, Goiás state. They competed in the Copa do Brasil once.

History
The club was founded on November 17, 1965. Santa Helena won the Campeonato Goiano Second Level in 1986, 2005, and in 2008 and the Campeonato Goiano Third Level in 2007. They competed in the Copa do Brasil in 2011, when they were eliminated in the First Round by Uberaba.

Achievements

 Campeonato Goiano Second Level:
 Winners (3): 1986, 2005, 2008
 Campeonato Goiano Third Level:
 Winners (1): 2007

Stadium
Santa Helena Esporte Clube play their home games at Estádio Pedro Romualdo Cabral. The stadium has a maximum capacity of 10,000 people.

References

 
Association football clubs established in 1965
1965 establishments in Brazil